Francis Carson Hough (born 12 April 1944) is a former Australian politician who remains politically active. Born in Subiaco, Western Australia, he was a self-employed business proprietor before entering politics. In 2001, he was elected to the Western Australian Legislative Council for Agricultural Region as a member of One Nation. After the resignation from the party of Paddy Embry in 2003, he and John Fischer were One Nation's only MPs in Western Australia. On 1 June 2004, he and Fischer both resigned from the party to sit as independents. On 30 November 2004, Hough and Embry co-founded the New Country Party, and contested the 2005 state election as such. Both were defeated. He ran as the Palmer United Party candidate for the Division of Pearce at the 2013 federal election. At the 2017 state election, he ran unsuccessfully as an independent for the Agricultural Region.

In 2003 He called for a citizens' referendum on bringing back Capital punishment in Australia.

References

1944 births
Living people
One Nation members of the Parliament of Western Australia
United Australia Party (2013) politicians
Politicians from Perth, Western Australia
Members of the Western Australian Legislative Council
21st-century Australian politicians